The Androscoggin Creature is a mysterious animal that was found dead in Turner, Maine in Androscoggin County, Maine in August 2006. The creature attracted worldwide attention after Lewiston Sun Journal reporter Mark LaFlamme described it on August 16, 2006 in an article titled “Mysterious Beast” and made a connection from the unidentified animal to local lore: "[the animal] may be the mystery creature that has roamed the area for years, mauling dogs and frightening residents. Or it could be a dog that has been running wild in the woods".

Reports of similar canids appear all over the Kennebec-Androscoggin area, including Litchfield, Greene, Wayne, Auburn and most infamously Turner.

References

External links
Maine Today News Article
Mark LaFlamme

2006 animal deaths
Androscoggin County, Maine